The 2006 Asian Women's Club Volleyball Championship is an international volleyball tournament held at the Rizal Memorial Coliseum from May 24-May 31, 2006. Seven countries participated in the week-long event.

Results

|}

|}

Final standing

References
Asian Volleyball Confederation

2006 Asian Women's Club Volleyball Championship
V
Asian Women's Volleyball Club Championships
V